Storm over Wyoming is a 1950 Western film directed by Lesley Selander and starring Tim Holt and Richard Martin.

Plot
A range war develops between cattlemen and sheepmen. A couple of cowhands, Dave Saunders and Chito Rafferty, get caught in the middle when they rescue Tug Campbell, who's about to be lynched by sheep ranch foreman Jess Rawlins and his men without a fair trial.

In town, Rawlins seeks revenge, but saloon singer Ruby slips a gun to Dave, who shoots Rawlins' pistol from his hand. Ranch owner Chris Marvin returns to town and she believes her foreman Rawlins's lies, including his attempt to frame Dave and Chito after they catch one of Rawlins' men red-handed, rustling sheep.

Rawlins shoots the rustler with a rifle, then takes Dave and Chito prisoner and intends to hang them. Ruby intervenes again, sneaking a gun to Chito inside a guitar. The cowhands prove to Chris that the rustler was killed with a rifle, which neither of them carries. A gunfight ensues ending in Rawlins' arrest. Dave and Chris form a bond. But when Chito's girlfriend, Ruby, begins feeling romantic, Chito has other ideas and rides off.

Cast 
 Tim Holt as Dave Saunders
 Richard Martin as Chito Rafferty
 Noreen Nash as Chris Marvin
 Bill Kennedy as Rawlins
 Richard Powers as Tug
 Betty Underwood as Ruby

Production
Storm over Wyoming was the only Tim Holt Western shot in Agoura. This was required because the plot involved sheep.

References

External links

1950 films
American Western (genre) films
1950 Western (genre) films
Films directed by Lesley Selander
RKO Pictures films
American black-and-white films
1950s English-language films
1950s American films